M-41 was the designation of a former state trunkline highway in the Lower Peninsula of the US state of Michigan that began near Holton and ran north- and northwest-ward, ending at Hart.  The highway was created by 1919 and lasted until 1926. The designation has not been reused since.

Route description
M-41 followed the present day route of M-120 between Holton and Hesperia. The roadway ran northeast to the Muskegon–Newaygo county line. The highway turned north along the county line to the tri-point between Muskegon, Newaygo and Oceana counties. From there, M-41 followed the Oceana–Newaygo county line north to Hesperia. There it turned west to Ferry and then northwest to Hart.

History

When the state highway system was first signed in 1919, M-41 was designated between Holton and Hart. After the creation of the United States Numbered Highway System on November 11, 1926, and the designation of U.S. Highway 41 in the Upper Peninsula, the Michigan State Highway Department renumbered the state highways that had numbers that duplicated the then-new US Highways. In the process, the M-41 designation was decommissioned. the southern half became part of a newly designated M-20. The northern half was made part of M-82.

Major intersections

See also

References

External links

M-41 at Michigan Highways

041
Transportation in Muskegon County, Michigan
Transportation in Newaygo County, Michigan
Transportation in Oceana County, Michigan